McNevin is a surname derived from the Irish Mac Cnáimhín. Notable people with the surname include:

McNevin

Alexander McNevin (1885–1937), Canadian merchant and politician
Bruce McNevin (1884–1951), Canadian politician
William J. McNevin (born 1913), Canadian politician

MacNevin
 Thomas MacNevin (1814–1848) - Irish writer

Citations

References

Surnames of Irish origin